Sergio Previtali (born 27 March 1969) is an Italian racing cyclist. He rode in the 1996 Tour de France.

References

External links
 

1969 births
Living people
Italian male cyclists
Place of birth missing (living people)
Cyclists from Bergamo